The South Florida Railway Museum is a railroad museum located in the Deerfield Beach Seaboard Air Line Railway Station in Deerfield Beach, Florida.  It is operated by volunteers.

Location
SFRM is located in the historic Deerfield Beach Seaboard Air Line Railroad Station, which was built in 1926.  It is a registered historic place, and was restored in the early 1990s.  The station today serves Amtrak and Tri-Rail passengers.  The museum is located in the former Seaboard Air Line Less Car Load facility.

Exhibits
The museum features two operating model train layouts, depicting 2 different places: South Farmington Rail & Mule Railroad in HO scale and South Florida N Scale.  There is an extensive collection of model locomotives, showing off the liveries of the railroads through the years.

In addition, collections of apparel, tools, literature, and other items from 1901 to present.  Bells and whistles are also on display, as well as a full sized mock up of the tail end of a Pullman observation car.

External links
 Official Website
https://local.aarp.org/place/south-florida-railway-museum-deerfield-beach-fl.html

See also
 Boca Express Train Museum

Museums in Deerfield Beach, Florida
Railroad museums in Florida
Model railway shows and exhibitions